Polygonia undina is a butterfly of the family Nymphalidae first described by Grigory Grum-Grshimailo in 1890. It is found from Ghissar-Darvaz to the Pamirs-Alai and Tian-Shan in north-western China and the Himalayas.

Taxonomy
It was treated as a subspecies of Polygonia egea, but DNA analysis concluded it deserves species status.

References

Further reading

 

Nymphalini
Butterflies described in 1890
Taxa named by Grigory Grum-Grshimailo
Butterflies of Asia